Ganyuting is a supermarket and department store chain in Ji'an, Jiangxi, China. The headquarters are in Qingyuan District, and as of 2013 the company has about 2,000 employees and 67 locations throughout Ji'an.

As of that 2013 there were new entrants in Ji'an's supermarket market, which had the possibility of affecting both Ganyuting and Guoguang, which were the two established companies in the region.

References

External links

 Ganyuting 
 Ganyuting Trading Company 

Companies based in Jiangxi
Supermarkets of China
Chinese brands
Buildings and structures in Ji'an